George Bell Swift (December 14, 1845July 2, 1912; buried in Rosehill Cemetery) served as mayor of Chicago, Illinois (1893; 1895–1897) for the Republican Party.  He was selected to replace the assassinated Carter Harrison, Sr. as Mayor pro tem in 1893 and lost a bid for election as mayor that year. He was elected mayor when he ran in 1895.

Early life and career
Swift was born in Cincinnati, Ohio to Samuel W. Swift and Elizabeth Swift (born Bell). His family moved to Galena, Illinois when he was young. By his teenage years, the family was living in Chicago. Prior to serving as mayor of Chicago, Swift served two terms as an alderman from the 11th Ward (one term from 1879 to 1881 and one term from 1892 until 1894 (the latter of which he was serving during his acting mayoralty in 1893). From 1887 to 1889, he was the city's Commissioner of Public Works.

Swift was a proponent of the City Beautiful movement.

Acting mayoralty
After the assassination of Carter Harrison Sr., the Chicago City Council selected Swift to serve as acting mayor.

Swift was sworn in as acting mayor on November 9, 1893.

The following month, he lost the special election to fill the remainder of Harrison's term to Democrat John Patrick Hopkins. Hopkins took office as mayor on December 27, 1893, ending Swift's acting mayoralty.

Mayoralty
In 1895, Swift was elected mayor of Chicago, defeating Democratic nominee Frank Wenter by a broad margin.

Swift was sworn in as mayor on April 8, 1895.

Swift declined to seek reelection in 1897, and was succeeded by Democrat Carter Harrison Jr. on April 15, 1897.

References

External links 
 
 Mayor George Bell Swift Inaugural Address, 1895, Chicago Public Library

1845 births
1912 deaths
Politicians from Cincinnati
Burials at Rosehill Cemetery
Chicago City Council members
Mayors of Chicago
Illinois Republicans
19th-century American politicians